The New York Greeks was an American soccer club based in New York City that was a member of the American Soccer League.

The team began as the amateur Greek-Americans. The club played lower Premier Division of the German American Soccer League which was based in the New York metropolitan area. The team won the Premier Division championship in 1950/51 and was promoted to the upper Major "Big 12" Division for the following season. Following their last place finish in the 1953/54 season, the club was relegated. The team was again promoted to the upper division for the 1960/61 season. The Greek-American Reserves team won the Dr. Manning Challenge Cup in 1954.

For the 1964/65 season, the club joined the "super-league" Eastern Professional Soccer Conference. After the EPSC folded at the end of its only season, the team returned to the GASL.

The club joined the ASL when it took over the inactive New York Inter franchise before the 1971 season. After the 1972 season, the club changed their name to the New York Apollo. Before the 1980 season, the team became the New York United.

Coaches
 Gene Chyzowych (1976)
 Ted Dumitru (1976–1980)
 Virgil Mărdărescu (1980)
 Rodney Marsh (1980)
 Jimmy McGeough (1980–1981)

Yearly awards
ASL All-Star Team
1977 – Paul Dawidczynski, Mario Garcia, Keith Van Eron
1978 – Chris Tyson
1979 – Chris Tyson
1980 – Chris Tyson
1981 – George Taratsides, Chris Tyson

Year-by-year

References

American Soccer League (1933–1983) teams
Defunct soccer clubs in New York City
New
Greek-American culture in New York City
Apollo
Diaspora soccer clubs in the United States